"Hot Boyz" is a song by American hip hop recording artist Missy Elliott featuring American rapper and singer-songwriter Lil' Mo. The remix version of the song was an urban hit featuring Nas, Eve and Q-Tip. The remix broke the record for most weeks at number-one on the US R&B chart on the issue dated January 15, 2000; as well as spending 18 weeks at number one on the Hot Rap Singles from  December 4, 1999, to March 25, 2000, a record not broken until "Old Town Road" by Lil Nas X in 2019. The song also reached number 5 on the US Hot 100 on January 15, 2000. In the UK, the song became the biggest hit from the Da Real World album; it peaked at #18, being Missy's sixth top 40 and fourth top 20 solo success.

Music video 
Hype Williams directed the music video from October 13–14, 1999, which features Elliott singing and rapping in a huge arena, intercut with clips of dancers and strobe lights. Williams also used a vast amount of pyrotechnics, primarily used in the fast cuts to important figures in the video.  Cameos include Mary J. Blige, Ginuwine, and Timbaland. Nas and Eve were featured, but Q-Tip did not appear in the video. His section was replaced with Elliott's rap verse from the original version.

Track listings

US Single 
12" Promo
Side A
"Hot Boyz" (Remix) (Original Version) (featuring Lil Mo, Nas, Eve and Q-Tip) - 3:53
"Hot Boyz" (Remix) (Amended Version) (featuring Lil Mo, Nas, Eve & Q-Tip) - 3:53
"Hot Boyz" (Remix) (Acapella) (featuring Lil Mo, Nas, Eve & Q-Tip) - 3:50
Side B
"Hot Boyz" (Amended Version) (featuring Lil' Mo) - 3:33
"Hot Boyz" (Instrumental) - 3:35

12" Single
Side A
"Hot Boyz" (Remix) (Original Version) (featuring Lil Mo, Nas, Eve & Q-Tip) - 3:53
"Hot Boyz" (Instrumental) - 3:35
"Hot Boyz" (Remix) (Acapella) (featuring Lil Mo, Nas, Eve & Q-Tip) - 3:50
Side B
"Hot Boyz" (Original Version) (featuring Lil' Mo) - 4:35
"Hot Boyz" (Amended Version) (featuring Lil' Mo) - 3:33

CD Single
"Hot Boyz" (Amended Version) (featuring Lil' Mo) - 3:33
"Hot Boyz" (Remix Amended Version) (featuring Lil Mo, Nas, Eve & Q-Tip) - 3:53
"Hot Boyz" (Remix Original Version) (featuring Lil Mo, Nas, Eve & Q-Tip) - 3:53

CD Maxi-Single
"Hot Boyz" (Remix Original Version) (featuring Lil Mo, Nas, Eve & Q-Tip)
"U Can't Resist" (Original Version) (featuring B.G. & Juvenile)
"She's A Bitch" (Original Version)
"She's A Bitch" (Blaze 2000 Remix)
"Hot Boyz" (Instrumental)
"Hot Boyz" (Remix Acapella) (featuring Nas, Eve & Q-Tip)

Charts

Weekly charts

Year-end charts

References

1999 singles
Missy Elliott songs
Eve (rapper) songs
Lil' Mo songs
Nas songs
Q-Tip (musician) songs
Songs written by Timbaland
Songs written by Missy Elliott
Song recordings produced by Timbaland
Music videos directed by Hype Williams
Songs written by Nas
Songs written by Eve (rapper)
1999 songs
Elektra Records singles
Songs written by Q-Tip (musician)